The 1971 Icelandic Cup was the 12th edition of the National Football Cup. Vikingur Reykjavik were winners.

It took place between 7 July 1969 and 9 December 1969, with the final played at Melavöllur in Reykjavik. The cup was important, as winners qualified for the UEFA Cup Winners' Cup (if a club won both the league and the cup, the defeated finalists would take their place in the Cup Winners' Cup).

Clubs playing in Europe (ÍA Akranes and ÍBV Vestmannaeyjar) did not enter until the quarter finals. Other teams from the 1. Deild (1st division), entered at the fourth round. As with previous years, teams from the 2. Deild (2nd division) and 3. Deild played in one-legged matches. In case of a draw, the match was replayed.

Vikingur Reykjavik became the first 2. Deild team to win the competition, beating newly promoted Breiðablik Kopavogur in the final by the narrowest of margins (1–0). It was the first national trophy for the club who had a memorable season: this trophy, promotion to the 1. Deild, and qualification for Europe.

First round

Second round

Third round

Fourth round 

 Entry of Valur Reykjavik, Breidablik Kopavogur, ÍBA Akureyri, Fram Reykjavik, ÍBK Keflavík and KR Reykjavík.

Quarter finals 

 Entry of ÍA Akranes and ÍBV Vestmannaeyjar.

Semi finals

Final 

 Vikingur Reykjavik won their first Icelandic Cup and qualified for the 1972–73 European Cup Winners' Cup.

See also 

 1971 Úrvalsdeild
 Icelandic Men's Football Cup

External links 
  1971 Icelandic Cup results at the site of the Icelandic Football Federation

Icelandic Men's Football Cup
Iceland
1971 in Iceland